Ron or Ronald Bailey may refer to:
 Ron Bailey (rugby league) (1914–1989), Australian rugby league footballer of the 1930s and 1940s
 Ronald Bailey (cricketer) (1923–1990), English cricketer
 Ron Bailey (politician) (1926–2015), New Zealand politician of the Labour Party
 Ronald Bailey (born 1953), American science writer
 Ronald Bailey (diplomat) (1917–2010), British diplomat
 Ronald L. Bailey, United States Marine Corps officer